William Abel Pantin  (1 May 1902 – 10 November 1973) was an historian of medieval England who spent most of his academic life at the University of Oxford.

Life
Pantin was born in Blackheath, south London, on 1 May 1902. He was educated at Westminster School and Christ Church, Oxford, where he obtained a first-class degree in Modern History in 1923. He undertook research at the University of Oxford after winning a Bryce Research Studentship.

From 1926 he taught history at the Victoria University of Manchester, first as an Assistant Lecturer and then as the Bishop Fraser Lecturer. At Manchester he worked under F. M. Powicke, Professor of Mediaeval History, who influenced Pantin's work for the rest of his life. In 1929 the Royal Historical Society awarded its Alexander Prize to Pantin for his essay The General and Provincial Chapters of the English Black Monks, 1215–1540. The "Black Monks" were the Order of Saint Benedict, whose history in England remained a subject of Pantin's research and published works for the rest of his life.

In 1928 Powicke moved to Oxford to become Regius Professor of Modern History. In 1933 Pantin followed, becoming a tutorial fellow and Lecturer in History at Oriel College, Oxford. He was also a university lecturer in mediaeval archaeology and history from 1937 onwards.

Pantin was active in the Oxford Architectural and Historical Society (OAHS), serving on the Editorial Committee of its journal Oxoniensia and on the OAHS's Sub-Committee for Old Houses. He was President of the OAHS 1959–64.

During his career at Oxford a substantial number of the city's unique mediaeval buildings were destroyed for redevelopment. In 1936–37 the University of Oxford had a row of historic houses in Broad Street demolished to make way for the New Bodleian Library. In 1954–55 F. W. Woolworth had the mediaeval Clarendon Hotel in Cornmarket Street demolished to make way for a new retail store. In 1959 Oxford City Council had Lower Fisher Row beside Castle Mill Stream demolished as slum clearance. In each case Pantin recorded the buildings as fully as possible before and during their demolition, and published his results in Oxoniensia.

In 1940 Pantin was appointed General Editor of the Oxford Historical Society. He developed an interest in the archives of the University of Oxford, which in 1946 appointed him Keeper of the Archives.

Pantin was appointed a Fellow of the British Academy (FBA) in 1948 and was a member of the Royal Commission on the Historical Monuments of England from 1963 onwards.

Pantin retired from his college and university posts in 1969, and Oriel College made him an Honorary Fellow in 1971. He died on 10 November 1973.

Charitable trust
There was a William Abel Pantin Trust to further historical research in Oxford and support the charitable and educational functions of the Provost and Fellows of Oriel College, Oxford. It was founded in January 1971 and dissolved in August 2013.

Works

 (Also published as an offprint)

 (Also published as an offprint)
 (Also published as an offprint)
 (Also published as an offprint)
 (Also published as an offprint)

 (Also published as an offprint)

 (Also published as an offprint)

 (Also published as an offprint)

References

Sources

1902 births
1973 deaths
Alumni of Christ Church, Oxford
British medievalists
Historians of Christianity
Fellows of Oriel College, Oxford
Fellows of the British Academy
Historians of the British Isles
British local historians
People educated at Westminster School, London
20th-century English historians
Keepers of the Archives of the University of Oxford
British historians of religion